Julie Lashell Adderley (born 1968) is a Bahamian lawyer and politician who has been President of the Senate of the Bahamas since 7 October 2021.

Career
Adderley is a lawyer who has worked as legal counsel for Bahamas First General Insurance, and as a legal and compliance manager and corporate secretary for Bahamas First Holdings. From 2017, she was a member of the Progressive Liberal Party's constitution committee to review its policies.

Adderley was appointed President of the Senate the day she was sworn in, 6 October 2021, the fifth woman to hold the role. She was appointed at the same time as Patricia Deveaux was made Speaker of the House of Assembly, the first time women have led both houses at the same time. Prime Minister Philip "Brave" Davis had been criticised the week prior for a lack of gender equality, with Adderley one of only two female Senate appointments.

References

Living people
1968 births
21st-century Bahamian lawyers
Bahamian women lawyers
Progressive Liberal Party politicians
21st-century Bahamian women politicians
21st-century Bahamian politicians
Presidents of the Senate of the Bahamas
Women legislative speakers